The Battle of Ramadi was fought in the spring of 2004, during the same time as the First Battle of Fallujah, for control of the capital of the Al Anbar Governorate in western Iraq. A coalition military force consisting of the 2nd Battalion, 4th Marines were stationed to defend the city from attack.

In April 2004, Fallujah was under siege by Coalition Forces and insurgents were looking to relieve pressure on the city by attempting an offensive of their own. Ramadi, the capital of Al Anbar Province, was seen as a center of gravity to coalition forces, and thus a critical city in western Iraq.

Before the battle started, insurgents cut off the highway out of Al Anbar to Baghdad.

On April 6, 2004, Marines fought with insurgents throughout the city in running gun battles that day. At the end of the first day of fighting 12 Marines had been killed in action. The following day fighting continued. Over the course of a four-day period it was reported 250 insurgents had been killed.

By the end of the battalion's tour in September 2004 33 Marines were KIA. The city remain an unstable environment throughout the course of the 2000s which lead to the subsequent battle in 2006.

April 6, 2004 
Beginning at 1048, Company G received small arms and RPG fire in the al-Maab District. The insurgents were pursued to a near by building were two squads and a quick reaction force continued fighting from 1145-1205. From there the squads were pinned down and the quick reaction force move to a support position where they were engaged one block east of Company G's position. Captain Christopher J. Bronzi, commander of the company, led his Marines in 24 hours of action. At one point he led a team onto the street to recover the body of a fallen Marine.

See also

 Battle of Ramadi (2006)

References

External links
Zoroya, Gregg. "Fight for Ramadi exacts heavy toll on Marines." USA Today. 12 July 2004. URL:https://www.usatoday.com/news/world/iraq/2004-07-12-ramadi_x.htm. Accessed: 2009-10-09 (archived by WebCite at https://www.webcitation.org/5kPS9x7tW).

Battles of the Iraq War in 2004
Battles of the Iraq War involving the United States
United States Marine Corps in the Iraq War
History of Ramadi
April 2004 events in Iraq